Trachoni is a village in the Nicosia District of Cyprus, located just south of Kythrea on the main Nicosia-Famagusta road. The town is under de facto control of Northern Cyprus.

References

Communities in Nicosia District
Populated places in Lefkoşa District